This is a list of monuments in Gulmi District, a district of Lumbini Province in western Nepal, as officially recognized by and available on the website of the Department of Archaeology, Nepal.

List of monuments

|}

See also 
 List of monuments in Lumbini Province
 List of monuments in Nepal

References 

Gulmi